Mutant Giant Spider Dog is a YouTube video that went viral with more than 179 million views in 2014.  The video was created by Polish YouTuber Sylwester Wardęga.

The video features Wardęga's pet dog "Chica" wearing a large spider costume.

According to the YouTube blog, "Mutant Giant Spider Dog" was the number one "top trending video" of 2014.

As of January 3, his videos have garnered around 560 million views, while his channel has over 3.3 million subscribers.

References

External links
 #YouTubeRewind 2014: Celebrating what you created, watched and shared from YouTube official blog

Viral videos
Individual dogs
Polish art
Practical jokes